The Snellville Days Festival is a two-day event held annually in Snellville, Georgia that draws crowds from all over the Southeast. The annual celebration is touted as one of the top 20 tourism events in May according to the Southeastern Tourism Society, but still holds that small town flavor. Snellville Days was voted "Best of Gwinnett" in 2012.

History
The first Snellville Days festival, held in 1974, was originally planned and organized by Jean Braley and the Morales as a one-time event to help raise funds to develop T. W. Briscoe Park as a community gathering place but city officials found the response to be so overwhelming that they decided to make it an annual event. The two-day event has since grown to become one of the greatest craft and community festivals in the Atlanta area. 

The old parade route followed U.S. Hwy. 78, but was changed in more recent years due to increased traffic volume. The route went down Wisteria Drive from US 78, left on North Road, then left on Oak Road, ending at City Hall. In earlier years, the parade had grown so much that it lasted two hours; the parade has since purposefully been reduced to approximately an hour. The last Snellville Days Parade was 2015.

There has been no festival since 2020 caused by the COVID-19 pandemic.

Planning
Planning and execution of the event is a year-long process undertaken by the city staff, the Snellville Days Committee, and a number of volunteers.

Festivities at T.W. Briscoe Park
Festivities following the opening ceremonies once consisted of simple games such as dunking booths and local crafts and entertainment but have been greatly expanded to include hand-made arts and crafts from almost 100 vendors, live entertainment, food booths, a children's activity area, and beginning in 2006, a museum sponsored by the Snellville Historical Society. Sponsors and vendors have contributed to the success of the festival; along with numerous volunteers and staff.

Themes and Grand Marshals by Year

External links
Official website

Festivals in Georgia (U.S. state)
Tourist attractions in Gwinnett County, Georgia